Poddar is a surname in India and Nepal
 Nepali people
Category : Nepalese Surname 
 Indian Surname

Notable people with the surname 
 Abhishek Poddar 
 Ajay Poddar
 Aparupa Poddar
 Bimla Poddar
 Giriraj Poddar
 Gopal Poddar
 Govinda Poddar
 Prakash Poddar
 Mahesh Poddar, Indian politician

References

Indian surnames